Mkange is an administrative ward in Chalinze District of Pwani Region in Tanzania. 
The ward is bordered by Pangani District to the north east and by Handeni District to the north west. Miono ward borders the ward directly to the west, and in the south the ward is bordered by Bagamoyo District. The eastern half of the ward is boarded by the Indian Ocean.

According to the 2012 census, the ward has a total population of 12,026. Mkange ward is the largest ward in Chalinze District and is also home to Saadani National Park, which covers the entire Chalinze coast, meaning Chalinze District has no direct access to the ocean. The Ward is also where the north half of the Wami River delta is located. Mkange ward is also where the Wami river also divides the border between Chalinze District and Bagamoyo District.

References

Pwani Region
Districts of Tanzania